Fort Belvedere may refer to:

 Belvedere (fort), a 16th-century fort in Florence, Italy, built by Grand Duke Ferdinando I de' Medici
 Fort Belvedere, Surrey, the country home of King Edward VIII, scene of his 1936 abdication
 "Fort Belvedere", a song by American postpunk band Live Skull from their 1986 album Cloud One

See also 

 Belvedere (disambiguation)